Marmaroplegma is a genus of moths in the family Eupterotidae.

Species
 Marmaroplegma conspersa Aurivillius, 1921
 Marmaroplegma paragarda Wallengren
 Marmaroplegma unicolor Janse, 1915

References

Eupterotinae
Moth genera